Marianne Wellesley, Marchioness Wellesley ( Caton, formerly Patterson; 1788 – 17 December 1853) was the American second wife of Richard Wellesley, 1st Marquess Wellesley, a brother of the Duke of Wellington.

Early life
She originated from Baltimore, Maryland, where her father, Richard Caton, was a merchant. The family was Roman Catholic, and Marianne's mother, Mary, was the daughter of Charles Carroll of Carrollton (died 1832), the last surviving signatory of the United States Declaration of Independence.

Personal life
Marianne first married Robert Patterson, whose sister Elizabeth (died 1879) was the first wife of Jérôme Bonaparte, Napoleon's brother. The Pattersons (originally spelled Paterson) were wealthy neighbours of the Catons in Baltimore. The couple came to Europe for the benefit of Marianne's health, bringing with them two of Marianne's sisters. One sister, Louisa, married a baronet, Sir Felton Hervey-Bathurst, in 1813, and after his death married Francis D'Arcy-Osborne, later Duke of Leeds. Another Caton sister, Elizabeth, married George William Stafford-Jerningham, 8th Baron Stafford, as his second wife.

Second marriage
On 29 October 1825 in Dublin, following the death of her husband in 1822, she married Richard Wellesley, 1st Marquess Wellesley, whose first wife died in 1816.  Prior to their marriage, they may already have been lovers. The marquess was short of money and Marianne's inheritance may have been part of the reason for his proposal. Her family disapproved of the marriage because of Wellesley's reputation and his several children by his first wife, Hyacinthe-Gabrielle Roland.

The marchioness's portrait was painted by Christina Robertson; an engraving by Thomas Anthony Dean is held by the National Portrait Gallery, London. She was also the subject of an unfinished portrait by Thomas Lawrence.

In 1830, the marchioness was appointed a Lady of the Bedchamber to Adelaide of Saxe-Meiningen, the queen of William IV of the United Kingdom, and held the position until King William's death in 1837.

She died on 17 December 1853, aged 65, at Hampton Court Palace, and was buried at Costessey, Norfolk.

References
Sources

Attribution 
 

1788 births
1853 deaths
Irish marchionesses
Carroll family
People from Baltimore
Patterson family of Maryland
Wives of knights